P. C. Joshi, the 23rd Pro Vice Chancellor of University of Delhi (born 1 June 1956 at Village Khairakot, Manan, Almora) is a Professor of Social Anthropology at the Department of Anthropology, University of Delhi, India.  His area of specialization is  Medical Anthropology  and  he focuses on Anthropology of Disasters, Anthropology of Development and on issues related to Social Exclusion and Adverse Inclusion.

He has been the Acting Vice Chancellor of the university since 29 October 2020 after the suspension of  Vice Chancellor Yogesh Tyagi.

Career

Prof. P. C. Joshi Pro Vice Chancellor of University of Delhi assumed office on 28 June 2020

Prof. Joshi was a delegate of the European Union at the United Nations Framework Climate Change Conference held at Poznan, Poland in 2008.

Professional membership
Joshi was the first president of the Society for Indian Medical Anthropology and Executive Member of the Ethnographic and Folk Culture Society based in Lucknow, India. He is a life member of the India Anthropological Association and a Life Fellow of the Indian Association of Social Psychiatry. He is the Editor of the Society for Medical Anthropology Bulletin.

Prof P.C. Joshi, Department of Anthropology, University of Delhi, has been appointed as the Pro-Vice-Chancellor,

On 28 October 2020,President of India who is visitor of University of Delhi has suspended incumbent VC Pro. Yogesh Kumar Tyagi and directed Pro. PC Joshi to assume office of acting Vice Chancellor of University of Delhi forthwith till further arrangements.

Awards and honours
P. C. Joshi was a recipient in 1987 of the Indira Priyadarshini Vriksha Mitra National Award as a founder member of Friends of Trees, and the Inter-University Centre Associateship Award in Humanities and Social Sciences, 1996–1999, Certificate of Honour at the First France-India Meet on Psychiatry, Psychoanalysis and Psychotherapy, 2007, Plaque of Appreciation from Department of Sociology and Anthropology, Xavier University Ateneo de Cagayan de Oro City, Philippines, 2008, and Certificate of Appreciation on his research on disaster impacts in Asia and Europe by Faculty of Public Health, University of Indonesia in 2009, among other honours and distinctions.

He also has the distinction of discovering a Paleolithic site in Delhi in 1983.

Publications
Joshi has co-authored nine books, over 157 articles, book chapters and reviews in area of Medical Anthropology, Traditional Medicines, Shamanism, Impact of Disasters, Life Style Diseases and Antibiotic Resistance. He has worked on many research projects and submitted over 14 research reports to various funding agencies and government policy planning agencies. He has worked in interdisciplinary areas with psychiatrists, psychologists, epidemiologists and other researchers on various topics and co-authored many papers. His papers have appeared in the journals such as World Development, Indian Journal of Pharmacology, Man in India, American Journal of Orthopsychiatry, Indian Journal of Medical Research, Journal of Clinical Pharmacy and Therapeutics, and National Medical Journal of India.

Publications include:

 Studies in Medical Anthropology (co-editor with Anil Mahajan), Reliance Publishers, New Delhi, 1990.
 Tribal Health and Medicines (co-editor with A. K. Kalla). Concept Publishing Company, New Delhi, 2004.
 Risk factors for Mortality and Injury: Post-Tsunami Epidemiological findings from Tamil Nadu (coauthor with Debarati Guha-Sapir, Lian Parry, Olivier Degomme, and J. P. Saulina Arnold). WHO Centre for Research on Epidemiology of Disaster, Brussels, 2006. (Also published in Hindi and Tamil)
The Impact of Recurrent Disasters on Mental Health: A Study on Seasonal Floods in Northern India

References

External links

1956 births
Living people
Indian anthropologists
Social anthropologists
Medical anthropologists
Academic staff of Delhi University
People from Almora district
Scientists from Uttarakhand